Marble soda may refer to:

Marble soda or Ramune, a Japanese carbonated soft drink sealed with a marble
"Marble Soda", a 2015 song by Shawn Wasabi